Jabalisaurus is an ophthalmosaurid ichthyosaur from the Late Jurassic La Caja Formation of Mexico. It contains a single species, Jabalisaurus meztli.

References 

Fossil taxa described in 2021